Alpha Bluff is a high bluff on the west side of Shults Peninsula, at the east side of Skelton Glacier in Antarctica. Surveyed and named in 1957 by the New Zealand party of the Commonwealth Trans-Antarctic Expedition (1956–58). Named after the first letter of the Greek alphabet because it is the most southerly of all bluffs on the Skelton Glacier.

References

External links
 

Cliffs of the Ross Dependency
Hillary Coast